Captain of industry and similar can mean:
Captain of industry, a business leader
Captains of Industry (band), a group formed by former Stiff Records performer Wreckless Eric
Captains of Industry (record label), an independent record label based in Durham, UK